Moulins-sur-Ouanne (literally Moulins on Ouanne) is a commune in the Yonne department in Bourgogne-Franche-Comté in north-central France.

Geography
The village lies in the middle of the commune, on the right bank of the Ouanne, which flows northwestward through the commune.

See also
Communes of the Yonne department

References

Communes of Yonne